Tarja Filatov (born 9 August 1963 in Hämeenlinna) is a Finnish member of Parliament representing the Häme constituency since 1995, and a former government minister. She belongs to the Social Democratic Party of Finland (SDP), and since February 2010 until April 2011 has been one of the two Deputy Speakers of the Parliament. Previously she was the vice chairman of the SDP parliamentary group (1999 - 2002) and the chairman of the parliamentary group (March 2007 - February 2010).

In 2000 she was appointed as Minister of Labour in Paavo Lipponen's second Cabinet (1999–2003), keeping the position in the short-lived Jäätteenmäki's Cabinet (2003) and then Matti Vanhanen's first cabinet (2003–2007).

References

External links 
 Official page (Finnish)
 Tarja Filatov's blog (Finnish)

1963 births
Living people
People from Hämeenlinna
Finnish people of Russian descent
Eastern Orthodox Christians from Finland
Social Democratic Party of Finland politicians
Ministers of Labour of Finland
Members of the Parliament of Finland (1995–99)
Members of the Parliament of Finland (1999–2003)
Members of the Parliament of Finland (2003–07)
Members of the Parliament of Finland (2007–11)
Members of the Parliament of Finland (2011–15)
Members of the Parliament of Finland (2015–19)
Members of the Parliament of Finland (2019–23)
Women government ministers of Finland
21st-century Finnish women politicians
Women members of the Parliament of Finland